Thoroughly Modern Millie is a 1967 American musical-romantic comedy film directed by George Roy Hill and starring Julie Andrews. The screenplay, by Richard Morris based on the 1956 British musical Chrysanthemum, follows a naïve young woman who finds herself in a series of madcap adventures when she sets her sights on marrying her wealthy boss. The film also stars Mary Tyler Moore, James Fox, John Gavin, Carol Channing, and Beatrice Lillie.

The soundtrack interpolates new songs by Jimmy Van Heusen and Sammy Cahn ("Thoroughly Modern Millie", "The Tapioca"), and Jay Thompson ("Jimmy") with standard songs from the 1910s and 1920s, including "Baby Face" and "Jazz Baby". For use of the latter, the producers had to acquire the rights from General Mills, which had used the melody with various lyrics to promote Wheaties for more than 40 years.

The film was nominated for seven Academy Awards and five Golden Globe Awards. It ranked eighth among high-grossing films of 1967. In 2000, it was adapted for a successful stage musical of the same name. A DVD was issued in 2003.

Plot
In 1922 New York City, flapper Millie Dillmount is determined to find work as a stenographer to a wealthy businessman and then marry him – a "thoroughly modern" goal. Millie befriends the sweet yet naive Miss Dorothy Brown as the latter checks into the Priscilla Hotel. When housemother Mrs. Meers learns that Miss Dorothy is an orphan, she remarks, "Sad to be all alone in the world." Unbeknown to Millie, the woman is selling her tenants into sexual slavery, and those without family or close friends are her primary targets.

At a Friendship Dance in the Dining Hall, Millie meets the devil-may-care paper clip salesman Jimmy Smith, to whom she takes an instant liking. However, she carries on with her plan to work for and then marry a rich man, and when she gets a job at Sincere Trust, she sets her sights on the attractive but self-absorbed Trevor Graydon. Jimmy later takes her and Miss Dorothy on an outing to Long Island, where they meet eccentric widow Muzzy Van Hossmere. Jimmy tells the girls that his father was Muzzy's former gardener.  Millie begins to fall for Jimmy, but she sees him summon Miss Dorothy from her room for a late night rendezvous, and assumes the worst.

Millie is even more determined to stick to her plan and marry Trevor. One morning, she goes to work dressed as a flapper and attempts to seduce him, but her effort fails. Eventually, Trevor sees Miss Dorothy and falls in love with her, and vice versa, leaving Millie heartbroken.

Meanwhile, Jimmy's attempts to talk to Millie are continually thwarted by no-nonsense head stenographer Miss Flannary. He eventually climbs up the side of the building and when he finally gets to talk to Millie, she tells him that she is quitting her job since Mr. Graydon is no longer available.

Mrs. Meers makes several attempts to kidnap Miss Dorothy and hand her over to her Chinese henchmen Bun Foo and Ching Ho, but Millie manages to interrupt her every time. When Mrs. Meers finally succeeds, Millie finds Trevor drowning his sorrows, and he tells her that Miss Dorothy stood him up and checked out of the hotel. Jimmy climbs into Miss Dorothy's room, lets Millie in, and they find all of Miss Dorothy's possessions still there. Millie realizes that Miss Dorothy is just one of several girls who have vanished without a word to anyone, except to Mrs. Meers. Together with Trevor Graydon, they try to piece the puzzle together. When Jimmy asks what all the missing girls had in common, Millie mentions that they were all orphans.

Jimmy disguises himself as a woman named Mary James seeking accommodations at the Priscilla Hotel, and "casually" mentions to Mrs. Meers that she is an orphan. Mrs. Meers spots Trevor sitting in his car in front of the hotel, becomes suspicious, and shoots him with a tranquilizer dart. Mary James is subsequently captured by Mrs. Meers and her henchmen, and Millie follows them to Chinatown, where the unconscious Jimmy has been hidden in a room in a fireworks factory where Miss Dorothy is sleeping. Trying to look casual, Millie smokes a cigarette outside the building, and when she begins to choke on it, she tosses it into a window, setting off the fireworks. As a series of explosions tear through the building, Millie dashes into the factory and finds several white girls tied up, about to be sent off to Beijing. She unties a couple of them, who then free the other girls, and then bumps into Miss Dorothy. They carry Jimmy out of the building and head for Long Island and Muzzy.

Mrs. Meers, Bun Foo, and Ching Ho follow Millie and the gang, but under Muzzy's leadership, everyone manages to subdue the nefarious trio. Millie then discovers that Jimmy and Miss Dorothy are actually millionaire siblings and that Muzzy is their stepmother who sent them out into the world to find partners who would love them for who they were and not for their money. Millie marries Jimmy, Miss Dorothy marries Trevor, and Muzzy marries one of her instructors.

Cast

Jimmy Bryant provided the singing voice of Jimmy Smith/James Van Hossmere

Production notes

Development
Hunter wanted to make a film of The Boy Friend, which had been a hit on stage with Julie Andrews. Film rights cost too much - $400,000 - so Hunter decided to do "his own". He managed to get Andrews to agree to star.

Setting
The film opens on "Thursday, June 2, 1922," although, in reality, June 2, 1922 was a Friday.

Cast
Although Pat Morita and Jack Soo each play Chinese henchmen, both were of Japanese descent; Morita was born in California, and Soo was born on a ship in the Pacific Ocean headed to the U.S. While he received no screen credit, Jimmy Bryant provided the singing voice for James Fox in this film.

Score
Elmer Bernstein composed the incidental score, for which he won his only Academy Award. The songs were arranged and conducted by André Previn.

Soundtrack

Act 1
 "Prelude: Thoroughly Modern Millie" - Julie Andrews
 Music by Jimmy Van Heusen and lyrics by Sammy Cahn
 "Overture: (A) Baby Face (B) Do It Again (C) Poor Butterfly (D) Stumbling (E) Japanese Sandman - Orchestra
 Stumbling: Composed by Zez Confrey
 "Jimmy" - Julie Andrews
 Music and lyrics by Jay Thompson
 "The Tapioca" - Julie Andrews, James Fox
 Music by Jimmy Van Heusen and lyrics by Sammy Cahn
 "Jazz Baby" - Carol Channing
 "Jewish Wedding Song (Trinkt Le Chaim)" - Julie Andrews

Act 2
 "Intermission Melody: (A) Thoroughly Modern Millie (B) Jimmy (C) Jewish Wedding Song (D) Baby Face - Julie Andrews
 "Poor Butterfly" - Julie Andrews, John Gavin
 "Rose of Washington Square" - Ann Dee
 Composed by James F. Hanley
 "Baby Face" - Julie Andrews
 "Do It Again!" - Carol Channing
 "Reprise: Thoroughly Modern Millie" - Julie Andrews
 "Exit Music: (A) Jazz Baby (B) Jimmy (C) Thoroughly Modern Millie" - Orchestra

Reception
The film earned $8.5 million in rentals in North America during 1967. At this time, Julie Andrews was the number one box office star in motion pictures. Thoroughly Modern Millie was her last film of the 1960s to make money. Her next two films, Star! (1968) and Darling Lili (1970), were colossal financial disasters. Andrews did not star in another hit film until 1974 when she co-starred with Omar Sharif in The Tamarind Seed.

Critical response
The film opened to good reviews and good box office. Bosley Crowther of The New York Times called the film "a thoroughly delightful movie," "a kidding satire, in a rollicking song-and-dance vein," "a joyously syncopated frolic," and "a romantic-melodramatic fable that makes clichés sparkle like jewels." He added, "Miss Andrews is absolutely darling – deliciously spirited and dry ... Having had previous experience at this sort of Jazz-age hyperbole in the British musical, The Boy Friend ... she knows how to hit the right expressions of maidenly surprise and dismay, the right taps in a flow of nimble dances, and the right notes in a flood of icky songs." He concluded "A few faults? Yes. There is an insertion of a Jewish wedding scene ... which is phony and gratuitous. There's a melodramatic mishmash towards the end, which has Mr. Fox dressing up like a girl and acting kittenish. That is tasteless and humorless. And the whole thing's too long. If they'll just cut out some of those needless things, all the faults will be corrected and it'll be a joy all the way."Variety observed "The first half of Thoroughly Modern Millie (sic) is quite successful in striking and maintaining a gay spirit and pace. There are many recognizable and beguiling satirical recalls of the flapper age and some quite funny bits. Liberties taken with reality, not to mention period, in the first half are redeemed by wit and characterization. But the sudden thrusting of the hero ... into a skyscraper-climbing, flagpole-hanging acrobat, a la Harold Lloyd, has little of Lloyd but the myth. This sequence is forced all the way."

Charles Champlin of the Los Angeles Times wrote that the film was "at its best a fresh-as-paint, cute-as-bees-knees, just swell enchantment" with Andrews "altogether superb," though he found the dance numbers "strangely uninspired" and that the second half suffered from "a slapstick but singularly uncomical chase."

Leo Sullivan of The Washington Post wrote "Highly insignificant and deliberately old-fashioned, the film veers and comments in a broadly stylized way ... All [Ross Hunter] may have produced is a commercial movie but enhancing the entire film is his own personal enthusiasm. He seems to be saying this is the way it was and yipes, wasn't it delightful. It was and is."The Monthly Film Bulletin wrote "An exploitative film in the sense that it exploits its stars' previous successes as much as their actual talents or the merits of its own script, it nonetheless manages, like the best camp, to make a merit of its defects and to turn the comic-caption corn of its dialogue into a positive attribute."

Roger Ebert gave the film a perfect four stars in his original review, a decision he later admitted in hindsight he was "no longer certain about."TV Guide rated the film three out of four stars and commented "Although it ultimately runs out of steam, this charming spoof of the 1920s is still one of the 1960s' better musicals ... Andrews is a comic delight, Moore is charming, and Channing steals scene after scene in this enjoyable feature." The film was one of four nostalgia-based movies that George Roy Hill made. After Thoroughly Modern Millie, he made Butch Cassidy and the Sundance Kid, The Great Waldo Pepper, and the Oscar-winning hit The Sting.''

On Rotten Tomatoes, the film has a 90% approval rating, based on reviews from 10 critics.

Accolades

Also, the film is recognized by American Film Institute in these lists:
 2004: AFI's 100 Years...100 Songs:
 "Thoroughly Modern Millie" – Nominated
 2006: AFI's Greatest Movie Musicals – Nominated

See also
 List of American films of 1967

References

External links

 
 
 
 
 

1967 films
1967 musical comedy films
1967 romantic comedy films
American musical comedy films
American romantic comedy films
American romantic musical films
Films about human trafficking
American films based on plays
Films directed by George Roy Hill
Films featuring a Best Supporting Actress Golden Globe-winning performance
Films produced by Ross Hunter
Films scored by Elmer Bernstein
Films set in New York City
Films set in the 1920s
Films set in 1922
Films set in the Roaring Twenties
Films that won the Best Original Score Academy Award
Universal Pictures films
Flappers
1960s English-language films
1960s American films